Crop tolerance to seawater is the ability of an agricultural crop to withstand the high salinity induced by irrigation with seawater, or a mixture of fresh water and seawater.  There are crops that can grow on seawater and demonstration farms have shown the feasibility. The government of the Netherlands reports a breakthrough in food security as specific varieties of potatoes, carrots, red onions, white cabbage and broccoli appear to thrive if they are irrigated with salt water.

Salt Farm Texel

The Salt Farm Texel, a farm on the island of Texel, The Netherlands, is testing the  salt tolerance of crops under controlled field conditions. There are 56 experimental plots of 160 m2 each that are treated in eight replicas with seven different salt concentrations. These concentrations are obtained with intensive daily drip irrigations of 10 or more mm (i.e. more than 10 liter per m2 per day) with water having a salt concentration expressed in electric conductivity (EC) of 2, 4, 8, 12, 16, 20 and 35 dS/m.  The range of EC values is obtained by mixing fresh water with the appropriate amount of seawater having a salinity corresponding to an EC value of about 50 dS/m. After planting, crops were allowed to germinate under fresh water conditions before the salt treatment started.

Soil salinity
The soil salinity is expressed in the electric conductivity of the extract of a saturated soil paste (ECe in dS/m).

Author Schleiff presented a classification of salt tolerance of crops based on ECe in dS/m  that may be summarized as follows:

^) The crop performs well (no yield reduction) up to the soil salinity level listed in the table. Beyond that level, the yield goes down.

The main difference with the classification published by Richards in the USDA Agriculture Handbook No. 60, 1954   is that the classes are narrower with steps of 2 dS/m instead of 4.

Modeling

The Salt Farm Texel uses the Maas–Hoffman model for crop response to soil salinity. The model uses a response function starting with a horizontal line connected furtheron to a downward sloping line. The connection point is also called threshold or tolerance. Up to the threshold the crop is not affected by soil salinity while beyond it the yield starts declining. The model is fitted to the data by piecewise linear regression.

Results

^) Many variety names are uncommon as they consist of 3 letters only 
*) It is not known what the results would have been if the planting was not done under fresh water  conditions but in saline conditions.
#) Graphs with scatter plots are shown in the report for these two varieties only. They show considerable variation both in Y (Yield) and X (ECe) direction.
x) For potato only one comparable value is known in literature, namely for the very sensitive variety white rose having a threshold of 1.7 dS/m 
+) For barley, in contrast, the U.S. Salinity Laboratory mentions a threshold value of ECe = 8 dS/m, which makes it a tolerant crop

Summary

The highest tolerance is found for the onion variety "Red" which classifies as slightly sensitive. All crops classify in the range from very sensitive over sensitive to slightly sensitive. There is no crop classified as tolerant, not even moderately tolerant.

S-curve model

In the Texel report, also the Van Genuchten-Gupta model (giving an S-curve) was used to find the soil salinity at the 90% yield point. The rationale for this was not given.

Lentils

The Mediterranean Agronomic Institute, Valenzano, Bari, Italy South coast grew 5 cultivars of lentil irrigated with sea water of different salinity levels. Saline water was prepared by mixing fresh water (EC = 0.9 dS/m) with sea water (EC = 48 dS/m) to achieve salinity levels of 3.0, 6.0, 9.0 and 12.0 dS/m. Some of the results are shown in the following table:

Halophytes

Halophytes, or salt loving plants, can be irrigated with pure seawater with the aim to grow fodder crops. A trial was made by Glenn et al. to use halophytes for feeding of sheep and it was concluded that the animals thrived well.

Setting the yield of an alfalfa (lucerne) fodder crop irrigated with fresh water (2 kg/m2) at 100%, the following results were obtained for the yield of halophytic crops irrigated with seawater:

Barley
After selecting the most salt tolerant strains, the University of California at Davis has grown barley irrigated with pure seawater and obtained half the normal yield per acre, i.e. half of the average yield per acre at national level. The experiment was conducted at Bodega Bay, North of San Francisco, in a laboratory on the Pacific Ocean.

Rice
Liu Shiping's team at Yangzhou University created rice varieties that can be grown in salt water, and achieve yields of 6.5 to 9.3 tons per hectare.

Lettuce, chard and chicory
In a recent trial comparing three seawater and freshwater blends (i.e. 5%–10%–15% of seawater), some scientists found that lettuce productivity was negatively affected by 10% and 15% blends of seawater, whereas chard and chicory’s growth was not affected by any blend. Interestingly, water consumption dropped and WUE significantly increased in every tested crop accordingly with increased seawater concentrations. They concluded that certain amounts of seawater can be practically used in hydroponics, allowing freshwater savings and increasing concentrations of certain mineral nutrients.

See also

References 

Agricultural soil science